Occella iburia is a fish in the family Agonidae. It was described by David Starr Jordan and Edwin Chapin Starks in 1904, originally in the genus Occa.

It is a marine, temperate water-dwelling fish which is known from the coast of Japan, in the northwestern Pacific Ocean.

References

iburia
Fish described in 1904
Fish of the Pacific Ocean
Fish of Japan